Estill Voice Training (often abbreviated EVT) is a program for developing vocal skills based on analysing the process of vocal production into control of specific structures in the vocal mechanism. By acquiring the ability to consciously move each structure the potential for controlled change of voice quality is increased.

The system was established in 1988 by American singing voice specialist Jo Estill, who had been researching in this field since 1979. Estill's research led to a series of vocal manoeuvres to develop specific control over individual muscle groups within the vocal mechanism. Soto-Morettini quotes Estill as saying the great strength of her method is that it can be used for any style of music, and speech and language therapists describe the exercises as valuable to voice therapy as well as singing, in both professional and non-professional voice use, offering an approach for therapeutic intervention. Estill Voice Training is a trademark of Estill Voice International, LLC.

Operating principles
Power, Source and Filter: Estill Voice Training partitions the vocal system into the three components power, source and filter extending the existing source-filter model of speech production. 'Power' is the source of energy producing the sound (typically the respiratory system causing air to be expelled from the lungs). 'Source' is the component that vibrates to create the sound waves (the vocal folds). 'Filter' is the shaping of the sound waves to create the final result (the vocal tract). The focus of Estill Voice Training is on the source and filter components of the vocal system and the interactions between them.

Craft, Artistry and Performance Magic: Estill Voice Training separates the use of voice into the 'craft' of having control over the vocal mechanism, the 'artistry' of expression relative to the material and context, and the 'performance magic' of a speaker or singer connecting with their audience. Estill Voice Training has a focus on the 'craft' aspect and hence has also been known as Estill Voice Craft by some practitioners.

Effort Levels: Estill Voice Training uses the identification and quantification of the level of work or 'effort' required for speaking and singing to help develop kinesthetic feedback. This approach enables a speaker or singer to recognize, locate and control the degree of effort involved in voice production.

Dynamical Systems Theory and Attractor States: The human vocal system is extremely complex, involving interactions between breath flow, moving structures, resonators and so on. Estill Voice Training draws on a branch of applied mathematics known as dynamical systems theory that helps to describe complex systems. One key concept Estill Voice Training takes from dynamical systems theory is the notion that complex systems can have attractor states. Attractor states are states to which a complex system tends towards, or is attracted to, over time. When applied to the human vocal system, Estill Voice Training proposes there are configurations of the vocal system that are attractor states, which the speaker or singer uses habitually or tend towards. For example, a subject whose attractor state is for their velum (also known as the soft palate) to be in a raised position may find it requires more conscious effort to create a nasal sound than someone else whose attractor state is for their velum to be in the lowered position.

Figures for voice
In Estill Voice Training there are thirteen vocal exercises or 'Figures for Voice' (named after the 'compulsory figures' that figure skaters use to demonstrate proficiency). Each exercise or 'figure' establishes control over a specific structure of the vocal mechanism, in isolation, by moving the structure through a number of positions. For example, the figure for velum (soft palate) control involves moving the velum through raised, partially lowered and lowered positions. The thirteen Figures for Voice are:
True Vocal Folds: Onset/Offset Control
False Vocal Folds Control
True Vocal Folds: Body-Cover Control
Thyroid Cartilage Control
Cricoid Cartilage Control
Larynx Control
Velum Control
Tongue Control
Aryepiglottic Sphincter Control
Jaw Control
Lips Control
Head and Neck Control
Torso Control

These Figures for Voice exercises have a focus basic anatomy and vocal physiology, a knowledge of which helps encourage deductions on reducing constriction and healthy voice decisions. Janice Chapman, the operatic singer, voice teacher and researcher, writes "Estill figures lead to a much greater freedom and flexibility in the demanding work of the singer and actor."

Figures for Voice are taught on the course 'Level One: Figures for Voice' that typically lasts three days. In addition to the thirteen Figures for Voice, Estill Voice Training also includes the 'Siren' exercise where a sound is produced across the entire vocal range. Other figures are historically part of the model including vocal fold mass which is now part of true vocal fold body-cover control, vocal fold plane which is now part of true vocal folds body-cover control and exercises for falsetto quality, and pharyngeal width which is now part of false vocal folds control and head and neck control.

True Vocal Folds: Onset/Offset Control: In this figure there are three options for coordinating expiration and vocal fold closure: glottal where the vocal folds are closed before expiration, smooth where vocal fold closure is synchronised with expiration, and aspirate where expiration precedes vocal fold closure. Learning to produce and apply different onsets marks the beginning of control over the vocal mechanism.

False Vocal Folds Control: Estill Voice Training identifies three possible positions of the false vocal folds: constricted, mid and retracted. This figure is helpful in identification of glottal and ventricular constriction. Its concepts and options are valuable to voice therapy as well as singing. The silent laugh technique, developed into an exercise by Jo Estill, is widely cited as reducing false vocal fold constriction.

True Vocal Folds: Body-Cover Control: The 'body-cover theory' of vocal fold structure was introduced by Hirano in 1977. This figure demonstrates the controlled use of the vocal folds in four body-cover configurations: on the thick edge, on the thin edge, in a stiff mode, or in a slack mode. These body-cover configurations change or modify the vibratory modes of the true vocal folds and, within the dynamical system of the human voice, effect the intensity of the sound produced and contribute to what are commonly labeled as the different human vocal registers. This figure was formerly known as vocal fold mass.

Thyroid Cartilage Control: This figure demonstrates control of the position or tilt of the thyroid cartilage through engagement or disengagement of the cricothyroid muscle. The speaker or singer can tilt the thyroid cartilage by adopting the posture of crying or sobbing, or making a soft whimpering noise, like a small dog whining. In Estill Voice training, it is proposed that the position of the thyroid cartilage influences not only pitch but also the quality and intensity of the sound produced.

Cricoid Cartilage Control: This figure demonstrates control of the position of the cricoid cartilage. In Estill Voice training it is proposed that specific positioning of the cricoid cartilage is a typical part of the vocal set-up for shouting and other high-intensity voice productions employing higher subglottic pressure.

Larynx Control: This figure trains raising and lowering of the larynx influencing resonance. This figure was formerly known as the larynx height figure.

Velum Control: This figure trains the velum (also known as the soft palate) and consists of exercises opening, partially closing and completely closing the velopharyngeal port to control the degree of nasality in the voice. Dinah Harris writes, "Estill has excellent exercises for learning palatal control."

Tongue Control: This figure demonstrates the influences of different tongue postures, such as compressed. As a practical example, Diane Sheets (Estill Voice Training Certified Course Instructor) worked on the interaction of tongue and larynx when dealing with the vocal problems of Marty Roe, lead vocalist of Diamond Rio. Control of the tongue can have subtle resonance changes and give greater flexibility to the range.

Aryepiglottic Sphincter Control: This figure demonstrates the ability to control twang in the voice through conscious anteroposterior narrowing of the aryepiglottic sphincter in the upper epilarynx while avoiding constriction of the false vocal folds. Estill suggests that this laryngeal tube creates a separate resonator that is responsible for the extra brightness in phonation.

Jaw Control: The jaw figure demonstrates the subtle resonance changes in voice production that are associated with different positions or postures of the jaw.

Lips Control: This figure demonstrates various lip postures employed by speakers and singers and their subtle impact on vocal resonance through changing the length of the vocal tract.

Head and Neck Control: Head and neck anchoring involves bracing the skeletal structures of the head and neck gives a stable external framework for the smaller muscles that control the vocal tract.

Torso Control: Torso anchoring stabilises the body and breath. Gillyanne Kayes writes, 'Techniques for anchoring the tone have been described over the centuries by singers and teachers under a variety of names: support, singing from the back, singing from the neck, appoggiare, rooting, grounding and connecting the voice. In the Estill training model, I believe these techniques have been correctly identified as postural anchoring.'

Voice qualities
Estill Voice Training incorporates six 'voice qualities' as mechanisms for demonstration of voice production control. The increased control developed through proficiency in the different Figures for Voice allows the singer or speaker to manipulate the vocal mechanism specifically to produce these arbitrary voice qualities, and variations on them. Essentially these voice qualities, such as 'Sob Quality' and 'Belt Quality', are constructed from moving the structures of the vocal mechanism into specific positions or combinations. For example, Sob Quality includes a low larynx position (the larynx figure) and thin vocal folds (the true vocal fold body & cover figure). The six voice qualities are:
Speech
Falsetto
Sob
Twang (Oral and Nasal variations)
Belting
Opera

Voice qualities are taught on the course 'Level Two: Figure Combinations for Six Voice Qualities' that typically lasts two days.

Speech: Speech quality is often termed modal speech by voice scientists or chest voice by singers. Speech quality includes thick vocal folds and a neutral larynx position.

Falsetto: In Estill Voice Training terminology, the term falsetto has a meaning distinct from falsetto as a male vocal register in Western classical terminology.

Sob: Sob quality is a soft and dark sound, associated with the sobbing cry of an adult who mourns. Sob quality is produced on a lowered larynx and thinned vocal folds. Sob quality releases glottal hyperadduction and medial compression, lowers the larynx and releases pharyngeal constriction. Mary Hammond says that young performers find low larynx and sob quality less familiar. Cry quality is a permutation of sob quality adopting a higher laryngeal position.

Twang: The key to twang quality is a narrowing of the epilarynx via a narrowing or constriction of the aryepiglottic sphincter. Twang quality has been used by speakers and singer to boost vocal resonance or 'squillo' and is referred to as the speaker's ring or singer's formant. The quality is excellent when teaching safe shouting and at cutting through background noise, increasing clarity of the voice, and is taught to both singers and actors to enable them to be heard clearly in large auditoria without vocal strain. Twang quality may be nasalized or oral, as differentiated by an open or closed velopharyngeal port. Estill suggests setting the vocal tract initially by imitating a cat yowling, ducks quacking, and other exercises.

Opera: Opera quality is a complex set-up including a mix of speech quality and twang quality with a tilted thyroid cartilage, lowered larynx.

Belting: Belting or belt quality is a complex setup combining speech quality, twang quality, a tilted cricoid cartilage and raised larynx. Twang is an important component in belt quality. Gillyanne Kayes writes, 'Belting is not harmful if you are doing it right. Jo Estill has described it as "happy yelling".' Belt quality also uses clavicular breathing and has the longest closed phase with the highest subglottic pressure and the greatest glottic resistance.

Certification
Estill Voice International governs the Estill Voice Training Certification Programme. There are three forms of Estill Voice Training certification available for individuals:
Estill Figure Proficiency  (EFP) is awarded to individuals who can demonstrate the basic options for voice control taught in Estill Voice Training™ Level One (Figures for Voice Control), and Level Two (Figure Combinations for Six Voice Qualities) courses with appropriate Hand Signals.
Estill Master Trainer (EMT) qualifies an individual to teach Estill Voice Training within their private studio, course practice sessions or classroom setting. The certification is a two-stage examination including written and voice control components, and observed teaching.
Estill Mentors and Course Instructors  (EMCI) follows Estill Master Trainer, qualifying an individual to teach Estill Voice Training in public courses, seminars and conferences. The certification is a two-stage examination including written and oral components and observed presentations.

Influence, adoption and application
Estill Voice Training has been adopted by voice professionals worldwide and a list of certified instructors is published by Estill Voice International. Joan Melton describes the Estill Voice Training terminology as a part of the language of singing teachers in Australia, with terms such as twang and anchoring in common use, although "the Estill language is heard somewhat less frequently in the UK and only occasionally in the United States." Freelance voice teacher and speech and language therapist Christina Shewell writes, "Estill Voice Training clarifies many of the complex vocal tract options that shape the style of a singers voice, explaining and demonstrating different combinations of structural conditions, and many singing teachers use the system as part of their teaching."
The following list gives some examples of the application of Estill Voice Training in a range of disciplines:
 Pop Singing: Maureen Scott is a Certified Master Teacher whose clients include Mika and The Enemy.
 Country Singing: Diane Sheets is a Certified Course Instructor whose clients have included Marty Roe of Nashville Country Band Diamond Rio.
 Acting: Estill Voice Training has been integrated into the training of actors at Mountview Academy of Theatre Arts in London.
 Musical Theatre: Faculty teaching on Musical Theatre training courses reference their Estill Voice Training certification. Examples include Steven Chicurel, Certified Course Instructor with testing privileges and service distinction, who is an associate professor of theatre at the University of Central Florida, and Anne-Marie Speed, Certified Course Instructor with testing privileges and service distinction, who teaches spoken voice on the Musical Theatre course at the Royal Academy of Music in London.
 Educational Curriculum: Educational institutions have adopted Estill Voice Training terminology and exercises into their curriculum. Examples include the Drama Centre at Flinders University in Adelaide, South Australia, where the Estill-based vocal technique is taught; London College of Music in its guidelines on the suggested development of vocal technique, as part of the music theatre syllabus, uses Estill Voice Training terminology; Saint Mary's College of California incorporates Estill and EFP preparation as a part of its undergraduate Music major; Motherwell College, Scotland, includes Estill Voice Training in its BA Honours Musical Theatre and BA Honours Acting programmes; and at the prestigious Bird College in London. and the Voice Performance and Musical Theatre programmes at Mars Hill College, North Carolina, include Estill Voice Training in their curriculum.
 Clinical Voice Therapy: Dinah Harris, contributor to The Voice Clinic Handbook, recommends learning Estill Voice Training as it provides many useful tools for those working in a voice clinic. Rattenbury, Carding and Finn present a study that used a range of Figures for Voice exercises as prognostic indicators and voice therapy treatment techniques.
 Community Choirs: Thomas Lloyd, Artistic Director of the Bucks County Choral Society, writes that he has "seen and heard results related to sound, dynamic range, consistency of support, and vocal color with [his] choirs, especially with [his] untrained singers."

Soto-Morettini writes that, 'although the Estill method can be very complex, there are a number of simple things that students can learn quickly — and that these simple things can go a long way towards clearing up the confusion that attends some vocal training.'

Criticism
Estill Voice Training has been criticised for not including 'breathing' and the related abdominal support within the system, and some of the uses of anchoring for classical singing, although Shewell cites Jo Estill as suggesting breath work as unnecessary if the Figures for Voice are well practiced.

Notes

References

External links
 Official Estill Voice International website

Human voice
Singing
Vocal skills